Batasi railway station is a small railway station in Darjeeling district, West Bengal which lies on the Katihar–Siliguri line. Its code is BTSI. The station consists of a single platform. The platform is not well sheltered. It lacks many facilities including water and sanitation.

References

Railway stations in Darjeeling district